"Wildcat" is an early short story by the American author Flannery O'Connor. It is one of the six stories included in O'Connor's 1947 master's thesis The Geranium: A Collection of Short Stories and was published posthumously in The North American Review in 1970. It later appeared in the 1971 collection The Complete Stories.

In this story, the main character "Old Gabriel," a blind, elderly African American man, is afraid of a wildcat, which he can supposedly smell. He remembers a story from his childhood of a wildcat killing someone he knew, and does not want to be left alone for fear that it will attack him. The story portrays Gabriel's struggles with his impending death.

References

Short stories by Flannery O'Connor
1947 short stories
Works originally published in the North American Review
Southern Gothic short stories